Victory Township may refer to the following places in the United States:

 Victory Township, Guthrie County, Iowa
 Victory Township, Mason County, Michigan
 Victory Township, Lake of the Woods County, Minnesota
 Victory Township, Venango County, Pennsylvania

See also

Victoria Township (disambiguation)
Victor Township (disambiguation)
Victory (disambiguation)

Township name disambiguation pages